Jess Lee Brooks (June 10, 1894 – December 13, 1944), also known as Jesse Brooks, was an American actor. He is perhaps most famous for playing the African-American church preacher in the critically acclaimed motion picture Sullivan's Travels, where he leads his congregation in singing "Go Down Moses".

Partial filmography

Dark Manhattan (1937)
 Spirit of Youth (1938)
 Two-Gun Man from Harlem (1938)
 The Sun Never Sets  (1939)
 Four Shall Die (1940) as Bill Summers
 Sullivan's Travels (1941) (uncredited) as Black preacher
 Lucky Ghost (1942) as Door Man
 Jungle Siren (1942) as Chief Selangi
 Broken Strings (1942)
Mr. & Mrs. North (1942) as Oscar
 Drums of the Congo (1942) as Chief Madjeduka
 Thank Your Lucky Stars (uncredited) as The Justice
Girl Crazy (1943) as Bickets
Son of Dracula (1943) (uncredited) as Steven

References

External links
 
 Jess Lee Brooks: A Black Western Actor in the Narrative of the American West

1894 births
1944 deaths
American male actors
African-American male actors